Mexicana Universal Tamaulipas is a pageant in Tamaulipas, Mexico, that selects that state's representative for the national Mexicana Universal.

Tamaulipas is the Fourth State that has produced more crowns in the history with 3 crowns. The State Organization has produced three Nuestra Belleza México in 1996 with Rebeca Tamez, 2004 with Laura Elizondo and 2015 with Cristal Silva.

To compete in the final state previously performed regional competitions: 
Mexicana Universal Cd. Victoria
Mexicana Universal Mante
Mexicana Universal Matamoros
Mexicana Universal Nuevo Laredo
Mexicana Universal Reynosa
Mexicana Universal de Tamaulipas.

Titleholders
Below are the names of the annual titleholders of Mexicana Universal Tamaulipas, listed in ascending order, and their final placements in the Mexicana Universal after their participation, until 2017 the names was Nuestra Belleza Tamaulipas.

 Competed in Miss Universe.
 Competed in Miss International.
 Competed in Miss Charm International.
 Competed in Miss Continente Americano.
 Competed in Reina Hispanoamericana.
 Competed in Miss Orb International.
 Competed in Nuestra Latinoamericana Universal.

Designated Contestants
As of 2000, isn't uncommon for some States to have more than one delegate competing simultaneously in the national pageant. The following Nuestra Belleza Tamaulipas contestants were invited to compete in Nuestra Belleza México. Some have placed higher than the actual State winners.

External links
Official Website

Tamaulipas